Kamran Elahian is an Iranian-American entrepreneur who is the chairman and founder of Global Innovation Catalyst and advises various governments on the needed transition from fossil-based economies to sustainable innovation economies. In the past, as a global high-tech entrepreneur, he co- founded ten companies, had 6 exits, 3 of them were Unicorn IPOs  with a total
market cap of over $8B. For 15 years he was Chairman of Global Catalyst Partners, a global VC firm ($350M
under management) with investments in the U.S., Japan, China, India, Israel and Singapore. Underlying his
vision for global philanthropy is the conviction that modern Information and Communication Technologies (ICT)
can be instrumental in dissolving barriers between nations and bridging the social and political differences
among people. This vision was reflected in Schools-Online, a nonprofit he co-founded in 1996 to connect the
world, one school at a time (6400 schools in 36 countries were provided with computers and access to the
Internet) and merged with Relief International in 2003; Global Catalyst Foundation, co-founded in 2000 to
improve lives through effective education and empowerment of the youth (with special emphasis on young
women) using the leverage of ICT, and UN-GAID, a United Nations global forum that promotes ICT in developing countries where he served as Co-Chairman (2009-2011).

Career

Kamran co-founded 10 companies: had 6 exits, 3 of them were Unicorn IPOs with a total market cap of over $8B.

References

External links 

 
Global Innovation Catalyst
Global Catalyst Foundation

American businesspeople
Living people
1954 births
University of Utah alumni
American people of Iranian descent